James Lenton Alty (21 August 1939 – 6 December 2022) was a British computer scientist who was Emeritus Professor of Computer Science at Loughborough University.

Alty was born in Haslingden, Lancashire on 21 August 1939.
He died on 6 December 2022, at the age of 83.

References

External links
 

1939 births
2022 deaths
Alumni of the University of Liverpool
British computer scientists
Academics of Loughborough University
People from Haslingden